

The Battle of Zagonara was fought on 28 July 1424 at Zagonara (Lugo di Romagna) between the armies of the Republic of Florence and that of Filippo Maria Visconti, duke of Milan, an episode of the Wars in Lombardy. A number of famous Italian condottieri of the 15th century took part in the battle.  The only condottiero who died in the battle was Lodovico degli Obizzi, who fell off his horse and suffocated in the mud.

The battle occurred when Carlo I Malatesta, lord of Rimini, intervened in support of Alberico Novello da Barbiano, whose troops were under siege in the castle of Zagonara  by Milanese mercenaries under Angelo della Pergola. Pergola had about 4,000 cavalry and 4,000 infantry. Malatesta's troops (amounting to some 8,000 cavalry) abandoned the siege of Forlì and attacked the Visconti, led by Secco da Montagnana.

Soon the initial attack of the Florentine cavalry waned. After several hours of fighting, they were routed by Pergola's counterattack. Malatesta himself was captured, together with about 3,000 men-at-arms and 2,000 infantrymen, and the castle was destroyed.

References

Sources
Leardo Mascanzoni: "La battaglia di Zagonara"

1424 in Europe
1420s in the Holy Roman Empire
15th century in the Republic of Florence
Conflicts in 1424
Battles involving the Republic of Florence
Battles involving the Duchy of Milan
Zagonara